Lewys Morgan Twamley (born 26 August 2003) is a Welsh footballer who plays as a forward for Newport County.

Career
Twamley made his debut for Newport County on 8 September 2020 as a second half replacement for Ryan Haynes in the 1–0 EFL Trophy defeat to Cheltenham Town. In June 2021 he signed his first professional contract with Newport County. On 10 January 2022 Twamley joined Salisbury on loan for the remainder of the 2021-22 season.  On 2 August 2022 he joined Pontypridd United on loan until 3 January 2023.

International
Twamley made his Wales Under-18 debut in the 2-0 friendly match defeat against England on 29 March 2021 as a second-half substitute. In August 2021 he was called up to the Wales under 19 team.

Career statistics

External links

References

2003 births
Living people
Welsh footballers
Wales youth international footballers
Footballers from Cardiff
Association football forwards
Newport County A.F.C. players
Salisbury F.C. players
Cymru Premier players